The Norwegian EHR Research Centre (NSEP) is the Norwegian research centre for electronic patient records at NTNU (Norwegian University of Science and Technology) in Trondheim.

External links
Official website

Norwegian University of Science and Technology
2003 establishments in Norway